Ali Imran Ramz popularly known as Victor is an Indian politician who served as the youngest member of the West Bengal Legislative Assembly elected in 2009 by-election and then 2011 election.

He is son of late Mohammad Ramzan Ali, a Forward Bloc leader and four term Member of West Bengal Legislative Assembly from Goalpokhar. The uncle of Ramz, Hafiz Alam Sairani is a three-time MLA and former Minister of West Bengal who also represented the same constituency.

He was first elected in a by-election in 2009 from Goalpokhar and subsequently re-elected from the newly created Chakulia in 2011. On 17th October 2022, He joined Indian National Congress in the presence of West Bengal Pradesh Congress President Shri Adhir Ranjan Chowdhury at WBPCC headquarters ( Bidhan Bhawan).

References

All India Forward Bloc politicians
Living people
West Bengal MLAs 2006–2011
West Bengal MLAs 2011–2016
West Bengal MLAs 2016–2021
People from Uttar Dinajpur district
1978 births
Jogesh Chandra Chaudhuri Law College alumni
University of Calcutta alumni
20th-century Bengalis
21st-century Bengalis